Offaly may refer to:
County Offaly, Ireland, formerly called King's County
Offaly (Dáil constituency)
King's County (Parliament of Ireland constituency) 
King's County (UK Parliament constituency)
Offaly GAA
A historic region of County Kildare, divided into the baronies of Offaly West and Offaly East
The medieval Kingdom of Uí Failghe